UWC-USA (legally named the Armand Hammer United World College of the American West) is a United World College founded in 1982 by industrialist and philanthropist Armand Hammer. Located in Montezuma, New Mexico, it is a two-year, independent, co-educational boarding school accredited by the Independent Schools Association of the Southwest with about 230 students representing 90-100 countries at any time. Students are between 15 and 19 years old, and the majority receive full or partial scholarships. They are selected from 155 National Committees that represent the United World Colleges around the globe.

In late 2007, The Wall Street Journal identified UWC-USA as one of the world's top 20 schools for its success in preparing students to enter top American universities.  In 2010, UWC-USA was ranked a “Top Ten Program” by U.S. Center for Citizen Diplomacy.

History 
American mogul Armand Hammer's The Armand Hammer Foundation purchased the property to establish a United World College in the United States in 1981. Major renovations of existing buildings preceded the school's opening in the fall of 1982, an event that was attended by HM King Charles III, then HRH Charles, Prince of Wales, and president of the United World Colleges movement at the time. The school's founding president was Theodore D. Lockwood, who served from 1982 until 1993. Philip O. Geier served as president from 1993 until 2005, when he passed the reins to Lisa A. H. Darling, whose presidency ended in 2013. The school's fourth president was Dr. Mukul Kumar '89, an alumnus and leader in international education, who left the school in 2016. The school is currently led by Dr. Victoria Mora, born in Albuquerque, a mother as well as a former Dean of the Santa Fe campus of St. John's College.

In 1998, the school's endowment was significantly increased through the generosity of investment manager Shelby M.C. Davis and his wife Gale. Their gift today secures the largest block of the school's student scholarships and provides $25,000 scholarships for all Americans who attend this school (or any other UWC) after being admitted by the U.S. national committee. Their initial gift of $45 million in 1998 was, at the time, the largest private donation ever made to international education.

Location

The campus includes the historic Montezuma Castle.

Notable alumni
 Sal Lavallo, American traveller
 Lousewies van der Laan, Dutch politician
 Michael Sugar, producer of Spotlight, winner of Academy Award for Best Film, 2016
 Philippe Wamba, American journalist
 Pavlos, Crown Prince of Greece
 Richard Rowley, film director 
 Giulio Regeni, Italian student abducted and tortured to death in Egypt.
 Iqbaal Ramadhan, Indonesian actor
 Emma Tucker, editor of The Sunday Times
 Pinar Karaca-Mandic, health economist
Paul Grimes, Senior Australian Public Servant
Gina Neff, American sociologist and author
David Rueda, professor of politics and economics at Oxford University

References

Sources
 "Dreams & Promises: The Story of the Armand Hammer United World College : A Critical Analysis", Theodore D. Lockwood, 1997

External links

United World Colleges
Independent Schools Association of the Southwest
Schools in San Miguel County, New Mexico
International Baccalaureate schools in New Mexico
Educational institutions established in 1982
1982 establishments in New Mexico